The Mortgage Brokerages, Lenders and Administrators Act, 2006 (the Act) came into force on July 1, 2008, replacing Ontario's Mortgage Brokers Act, 1990, and requires all individuals and businesses who conduct mortgage brokering activities in Ontario to be licensed.  The Act is currently administered by the Financial Services Regulatory Authority of Ontario.

Notable changes with the new legislation include:
 restrict the use of the titles, "mortgage brokerage", "mortgage broker", "mortgage agent", and "mortgage administrator" (and their French equivalents)
 application to real estate brokers who act as mortgage brokers in Ontario
 adding regulatory oversight to mortgage brokers who administer mortgages on behalf of third parties
 exemptions to educational requirements during the transition period for some individuals
 two-year licensing cycles
 introducing criteria for surrendering a license

See also
 Real Estate and Business Brokers Act

External links

References

Ontario provincial legislation
2006 in Ontario
2006 in Canadian law
Housing legislation in Canada